Lepechinia calycina is a species of flowering plant in the mint family known by the common name pitchersage or woodbalm. It is endemic to California, where it is a common plant in several different habitat types, including the chaparral plant community.

Description
Lepechinia calycina is an aromatic shrub with parts of its bark covered in long hairs, some of which have resin glands in them. The leaves are lance-shaped to roughly oval and are sometimes toothed along the edges.

The shrub flowers in loose raceme inflorescences. Each flower is encased in a cuplike calyx of sepals which are green when new and age to reddish purple. The somewhat cylindrical corolla of the flower is white to light lavender and is rolled back at the tip into four small lips and one longer lip. The tiny fruit develops within the sepal cup after the flower falls. The fruit is rounded, dark in color, and slightly hairy.

Uses
The Miwok, a Native American group of California, used an extract of the leaves of this plant to treat fever and headache.

External links

Jepson Manual Treatment — Lepechinia calycina
USDA Plants Profile
U. Michigan, Dearborn: Ethnobotany
Lepechinia calycina — U.C. Photo gallery

calycina
Endemic flora of California
Flora of the Sierra Nevada (United States)
Natural history of the California chaparral and woodlands
Natural history of the California Coast Ranges
Natural history of the Transverse Ranges
Taxa named by George Bentham
Plants used in traditional Native American medicine
Flora without expected TNC conservation status